Ayedaade is a Local Government Area in Osun State, Nigeria. Its headquarters are in Gbongan at the northern part of the area.

It has an area of 1,113 km and a population of 150,392 at the 2006 census. The postal code of the area is 221.  Local Government Chairman and Head of the Local Government Council is Nathaniel Arabambi.

The Ayedaade Constituency is represented by Isaac Adeyemi Taiwo, who is the Deputy Chief Whip (2010 - 2018) in the Osun State House of Assembly.

Ayedaade local government falls under the Irewole federal constituency represented by Ayo Omidiran and Osun West Senatorial District represented by Isiaka Adeleke in the Upper Chambers.

Notable People 
 
 
 Bolaji Amusan is a comic actor and filmmaker.
 Justice Bolarinwa Oyegoke Babalakin, Retired Justice of the Supreme Court of Nigeria
 Patricia Etteh is a politician and the first female Speaker of the Nigerian House of Representatives
 Isaac Adeyemi Taiwo is the Former deputy chief whip in the Osun state house of Assembly.
 Isaac Oladipupo is a journalist and entrepreneur.

References

Local Government Areas in Osun State